Vietnam will compete at the 2022 World Athletics Championships in Eugene, United States, from 15 to 24 July 2022. It has entered 1 athlete.

Results

Women 

 Track and Field Events

References

Nations at the 2022 World Athletics Championships
World Championships in Athletics
2022